Tequistlatec was the Chontal language of Tequisistlán town, Oaxaca. Highland Oaxaca Chontal is sometimes also called Tequistlatec, but is a distinct language.

Vocabulary
Word list derived from de Angulo and Freeland (1925):

{| class="wikitable sortable"
! gloss !! Chontal of Tequixistlan !! notes
|-
| sky || maa || 
|-
| sun || fonar || 
|-
| sunlight; hot; light, firelight || nyu || 
|-
| day || kina || 
|-
| morning (dawn) || pukia || (? < pu "to go out" + kine "day")
|-
| night || pugi || 
|-
| last night || timba || 
|-
| tomorrow || moggi || (cf. pugi "night")
|-
| late, late in the day, evening || mui || (cf. tomorrow)
|-
| to be late in the day || ka || 
|-
| moon; month || mura || 
|-
| star || lusero (Sp.) || 
|-
| fire || ngwa || 
|-
| ashes || pigg || (cf. stone)
|-
| charred wood, coal, charcoal || çna’ || 
|-
| cold || sita || 
|-
| to burn || nas, pi’ || 
|-
| to boil || mb’ula || 
|-
| to dry || hur || 
|-
| earth, soil, land, ground || mas, mats || 
|-
| mountain || mala || 
|-
| stone || pih || 
|-
| salt || weh || 
|-
| sand || puçi || 
|-
| ravine || nya || 
|-
| water || xa || 
|-
| river || pana’ m’am || 
|-
| to bathe || pos || 
|-
| sea || maxa || (cf. water, river)
|-
| air || ba || 
|-
| to last, pass || xika || 
|-
| week || çamana (Sp.) || 
|-
| (Perfect) || -pa, -ba || 
|-
| (Continuative) || -ngu (sg.), -mi (pl.) || 
|-
| (Present Future) || -ma (sg.), -me (pl.) || 
|-
| (Imperative) || -ra (sg.), -re (pl.) || 
|-
| (temporal suffix of obscure meaning) || -li || 
|-
| (Andative) || -kiç || 
|-
| (Causative) || -mu || 
|-
| (Impending Future) || -ga (sg.), -ri || 
|-
| high, long || tçogi || 
|-
| low, short || koki || 
|-
| big || be || 
|-
| little || taç, tçofi, tyof || 
|-
| out, outside, outdoors || nia || 
|-
| after || hoy, toy || (also used as "in order to", "with")
|-
| one || nula, nuli || 
|-
| two || kwesi || 
|-
| three || fane || 
|-
| four || malbu || 
|-
| five || mage || 
|-
| six || kandjiç || 
|-
| seven || kote || 
|-
| eight || malfa || 
|-
| nine || pela || 
|-
| ten || mbama || 
|-
| eleven || 10 + 1 || 
|-
| twelve || 10 + 2 || 
|-
| fifteen || 10 + 5 || 
|-
| twenty || nuçans || (? < nuli çans "one person")
|-
| thirty || 20 + 10 || 
|-
| thirty-five || 20 + 10 + 5 || 
|-
| forty || 2 X 20 || 
|-
| fifty || 2 X 20 + 10 || 
|-
| fifty-five || 2 X 20 + 10 + 5 || 
|-
| sixty || 3 X 20 || 
|-
| eighty || 4 X 20 || 
|-
| hundred || masno || 
|-
| two hundred || 2 X 100 || 
|-
| four hundred || 4 X 100 || 
|-
| yes || akya, oy || 
|-
| not || tçi, tçite || 
|-
| so, positive || oy, ony || 
|-
| much || yeste, yate || 
|-
| like, as || tor || 
|-
| with || ki or k + ... (fusion) || 
|-
| if || or || 
|-
| deer || mar || now used for cattle (at present benadu < Sp.)
|-
| horse || kabayu (Sp.) || 
|-
| jaguar || vesma, tigre (Sp.) || 
|-
| dog || tsigi || 
|-
| sheep || siggo || 
|-
| goat || tçibo (Sp.) || 
|-
| hog || kutçi (Sp.) || 
|-
| squirrel || tsetse || 
|-
| rabbit || koneçu (Sp.) || 
|-
| chicken || giti, puyu (Sp.) || probably originally the word for turkey
|-
| egg || piyi || 
|-
| parrot || genge, utçu || 
|-
| crow || bo’, pumli || 
|-
| snake || nvofar || 
|-
| lizard || moh || 
|-
| turtle || çiba || 
|-
| fish || tu’u || 
|-
| shrimp || tiçmu || 
|-
| bee || diçir || 
|-
| wax || pasi || 
|-
| honey || kofa || 
|-
| fly || hangwa || 
|-
| scorpion || nyayçpo || 
|-
| tree, wood, plant || eh || 
|-
| grass || pasto (Sp.), ça (doubtful) || 
|-
| leaf || pela || 
|-
| pine-nut || weka || 
|-
| gourd, squash || aba || 
|-
| cactus, nopal || pala || 
|-
| chile, pepper || kasi || 
|-
| sugar cane || pah || 
|-
| plátano, banana || owe, labe || 
|-
| tomato || ngone || 
|-
| corn, maize || kosa’ || 
|-
| bean || r’ane || 
|-
| flower || pipi || 
|-
| person || sans (sg.), sanu (pl.) || 
|-
| man, adult || kwe (sg.), gurbe (pl.) || 
|-
| old man; old || kano || 
|-
| young man, boy, youth; young || muli || 
|-
| woman || tee (sg.), deya (pl.) || 
|-
| old woman || kyopaya || (see "adult")
|-
| girl || bata || 
|-
| child (either sex), daughter, son || ’wa (sg.), naske (pl.) || 
|-
| baby, infant (either sex) || çer || 
|-
| husband || pewe || (pi semi-possessive + kwe man)
|-
| wife || pete || (pi semi-possessive + tee woman)
|-
| paramour || kye || 
|-
| to marry || man, pan, panu || 
|-
| grandfather || kube || (cf. "man")
|-
| father || ’ai’, ’yayi’ || 
|-
| mother || mama || 
|-
| elder brother; uncle || sapi (sg.), sarpi (pl.) || 
|-
| younger brother; younger sister || bepo || 
|-
| older sister; aunt || nota || 
|-
| I || ya || 
|-
| thou || ma || 
|-
| he || gge || 
|-
| we || yã || 
|-
| ye || mã  || 
|-
| they || re || 
|-
| it || i (sg.), n (pl.) || an indefinite demonstrative pronoun equivalent to "he", "the", "that", etc.
|-
| the || al, dal, gal, la || 
|-
| thine || ak || 
|-
| indefinite possessive article || pi || 
|-
| what? || kya || 
|-
| pretty || tçili || 
|-
| grown up, adult || tyopa || (see "old woman")
|-
| stranger || gwaya || 
|-
| Chontal || fale || 
|-
| Zapotec || nye || 
|-
| Yalalag || xoço || 
|-
| Tehuantepec || uçia || 
|-
| Oaxaca || pampala || 
|-
| Tequixistlan || al riya || i.e., "the village"
|-
| head || fa || 
|-
| neck || nukma || 
|-
| face || ’a || (cf. "head")
|-
| eye || ’uh || 
|-
| to see, look || mai, sin, çin || 
|-
| mouth || ko || 
|-
| tooth || ai’ || 
|-
| to eat || te, tes || 
|-
| to drink || sna, çna || 
|-
| to swallow || n’u’, n’uk || 
|-
| to feed a drink || k’ai || 
|-
| to taste good || xana || 
|-
| sweet || çuçki, tçutski || 
|-
| bitter || kwah || 
|-
| poison || çi || 
|-
| tongue || pala || 
|-
| word, language || taygi || 
|-
| to speak, tell, say || go || 
|-
| to ask || n’uma || 
|-
| to sing || ça || 
|-
| to cry || poh, hoh || 
|-
| to call || hoy || 
|-
| nose || ’nali || 
|-
| shoulder || çaye || 
|-
| to have, hold, get || oy, tuç, tçu || (cf. "yes, good, positive")
|-
| to lift || bana || 
|-
| to give || kay || 
|-
| to sell || ku’ || 
|-
| to buy || n’a || 
|-
| to steal || nans || 
|-
| to work, make, do || pa, pas, pat || 
|-
| to work || patçu || ("make-have")
|-
| to throw || ohm || 
|-
| to hit || na || 
|-
| to put, place || ponf || 
|-
| knee || nyingole || 
|-
| thigh || pate (Sp.) || 
|-
| to go || ’wa (sg.), lye (pl.) || 
|-
| let’s go || endza || 
|-
| to come || pa || 
|-
| to run || nu, nyu || 
|-
| to jump || tsolu || 
|-
| to meet together || kyo, to, tyo || 
|-
| to visit || nulka || 
|-
| to walk || tas || 
|-
| to go with, to accompany || lek, legg || 
|-
| way, road || ne || 
|-
| to go out, to pass || pu || 
|-
| to pass by || kas, ka || 
|-
| to leave, abandon || gansa || 
|-
| to ascend, go up || fha || 
|-
| to bring || ’u || 
|-
| to take out || kan || 
|-
| to send || gah’m || (cf. "to go")
|-
| to carry || ’wa || (same as "go")
|-
| to stand || kas || 
|-
| to stop || ’ay || 
|-
| to sit || pah, pan || 
|-
| to fall || kye || imperative: ter
|-
| hair || fah || (see "head")
|-
| flesh, meat || ci’ || 
|-
| hide (of animals) || çimi || (cf. "meat")
|-
| leather || baketa (Sp.) || 
|-
| nail || nalu || 
|-
| breast || pare || 
|-
| milk || letçe (Sp.) || 
|-
| belly || kun || 
|-
| back || napo || 
|-
| heart || nusma, nuçma || 
|-
| liver || bi || 
|-
| kidney || rinyon (Sp.) || 
|-
| blood || fas || 
|-
| to be, exist (essentially) || pa || 
|-
| to live, to exist || laç || 
|-
| alive || çax || 
|-
| to die || ma || 
|-
| to bury || muya || 
|-
| to sleep || çma, sma || 
|-
| to awake || çmafa || 
|-
| to wish, will, want || he || 
|-
| to love || fu || 
|-
| to know || çina || 
|-
| to hurt || kwan || 
|-
| to play, to amuse oneself to go visiting (cf. Sp. pasear) || sans || (cf. "people" sans)
|-
| thought || fa || 
|-
| to think || fasmu || (thought + Causative)
|-
| to cut || ke || 
|-
| knife || nabaxa, kutçilu (Sp.) || 
|-
| to kill || man || (cf. ma "die")
|-
| to frighten || çpatsa || 
|-
| hay || sakate (Sp.) || 
|-
| field || nyagga || (< nya "outdoors")
|-
| to sow || fa || 
|-
| brown sugar, panela || pana (Sp.) || 
|-
| clothes || tçale, manta (Sp.) || 
|-
| hat || speba || 
|-
| guepil (woman’s blouse) || perkasko || 
|-
| petticoat || bofai || 
|-
| trousers || sarber || 
|-
| shoe || kai’ || 
|-
| to dress || me || 
|-
| house || xur, hur || 
|-
| village || riya || 
|-
| plaza || naxki || (< n’a "to buy")
|-
| door || puerta (Sp.) || 
|-
| table || mes (Sp.) || 
|-
| chair || çila (Sp.) || 
|-
| bench || bangu (Sp.) || 
|-
| bed || kanga || 
|-
| hammock || some || 
|-
| cushion || tifle || 
|-
| cage || xaula (Sp.) || 
|-
| metate || djima || 
|-
| tenate (woven basket) || tapa || 
|-
| petate (straw mat) || pihma || 
|-
| jicara (smalled bowl) || laba || 
|-
| cantaro (jug) || xuti || 
|-
| olla || piçu || 
|-
| apaxtle (cooking stone) || pogo || 
|-
| comal || kwahi || 
|-
| fork || trintçe || 
|-
| spoon || kutçara (Sp.) || 
|-
| plate || pimi || 
|-
| food, meal || tefa, xaybe || 
|-
| bread || in || 
|-
| sugar || asukra (Sp.) || 
|-
| tortilla || skur || 
|-
| chocolate || txura || 
|-
| money || tomi || 
|-
| to dance || soy || 
|-
| church || soykye || (cf. "to dance")
|-
| to pray || sa, ça || (cf. "to sing")
|-
| santo, idol, sacred, holy || ndyuç, nuç || 
|-
| music || poh || 
|}

References

Tequistlatecan languages
Extinct languages of North America